The Anglican Mission in England (AMiE) is an Anglican convocation affiliated to the Anglican Network in Europe that seeks to establish Anglican churches in England outside the Church of England. It seeks to support Anglican churches and individuals both within and outside present Church of England structures. It was created with the support of the Global Anglican Future Conference, and is part of the Anglican realignment. It has been described as a "breakaway conservative Evangelical movement".

Leadership
AMiE has one bishop, Andy Lines: he was consecrated on 30 June 2017 as the Missionary Bishop to Europe of the Anglican Church in North America (ACNA), a province outside the Anglican Communion, but recognized by GAFCON and the Global South provinces. Lines' role is to provide oversight to Anglican churches in Europe that exist outside of current Anglican structures, which includes AMiE. Lines is also director of Crosslinks, an Anglican missionary agency which financially supports several independent Anglican churches in England.

In 2015 the Right Revd John Ellison, a retired missionary, was under investigation by the Diocese of Salisbury after it emerged he was acting as an overseer for Christ Church Salisbury, an AMiE congregation. Ellison is currently chair of the AMiE panel of bishops.

History
AMiE was formed under the auspices of the Global Anglican Future Conference (GAFCON) in 2011. GAFCON gave their full support at their second meeting in Nairobi, in October 2013. Initially its congregations were church plants that had been ejected from the Church of England for various reasons. More recently, evangelical Anglican churches have begun to plant churches under the AMiE banner.

The movement has received the support of the Archbishop of Nigeria, Nicholas Okoh.

In 2016 AMiE set out its vision to plant 25 churches by 2025 and 250 churches by 2050.

Bishop Lines ordained the first nine men as deacons and priests on 7 December 2017, at East London Tabernacle, a Baptist church in east London. Previously, clergymen associated with AMiE had come from the Church of England, or been ordained by Anglican bishops overseas. Eight men were ordained as deacons and one as a priest, all working for AMiE churches. For example, Robert Tearle, 24, was to serve as deacon at Trinity Church Scarborough, a 2017 church plant.

On 14 December 2020, AMIE became a proto-diocese (convocation) affiliated to the newly created Anglican Network in Europe; the network's other convocation is the Anglican Convocation in Europe, which has six churches in Scotland, Portugal, Cornwall and Surrey.

Theological position
AMiE takes a conservative stance on human sexuality, opposing same-sex marriage and women's ordination. Members of the executive of AMiE are required to hold complementarian views. AMiE leaders have made accusations that there is false teaching in Church of England leadership. Lee McMunn, the mission director for AMiE, has stated that, while many "faithful Anglicans" remain within the Church of England, others find their route to ordination "blocked by liberal clergy who do not believe orthodox Anglican teachings".

AMiE's stated intent is not to threaten Anglicans within current structures, but to provide support for those already outside the structures.

Churches
The society currently has 21 churches under its auspices and the oversight of Lines. This is an increase from 6 churches in September 2016.

AMiE is also aiming to plant a new church in Ramsgate in 2021.

Former AMiE churches 
The following churches disaffiliated from AMiE in 2020-21.

See also

References

External links
Anglican Mission in England Official Website

Religious organisations based in England
Christianity in England
Evangelical Anglicanism
Anglicanism in the United Kingdom
Anglican realignment dioceses
Reformed denominations in the United Kingdom
Anglican organizations established in the 21st century
Evangelicalism in the United Kingdom
Evangelical denominations in Europe